Luís Carlos Batalha Freire (born 3 November 1985) is a Portuguese professional football manager, currently manager of Rio Ave.

Beginning as a manager in amateur football in his 20s, he won six promotions in his first eight seasons, including as champions of the Campeonato de Portugal with Mafra in 2018. In 2020, he reached the Primeira Liga with Nacional, and did the same with Rio Ave two years later as champions of Liga Portugal 2.

Managerial career

Early career
Freire was born in Ericeira, Mafra, Lisbon District. He played as a defender in the youth academy of G.D.U. Ericeirense and C.D. Mafra, but quit football when he began studying at the University of Évora in 2005. While studying, Freire started training local athletes at Juventude. To gain visibility, he started scouting at Mafra, Tondela, and then Oriental, taking on assistant duties as well. Freire returned to university to study his Master's degree and started training his local side Ericeirense, as well as teaching on the side. When he received an offer to scout at S.C. Covilhã, Ericeirense offered him a managerial position for the first time in his career. He managed to achieve promotion, and joined C.A. Pêro Pinheiro where he was promoted again.

Freire's record of four promotions in his first five seasons of senior management earned him the nicknames of "The Poor Man's Vítor Oliveira" (after a specialist in promotion to Primeira Liga) and "The Mourinho of Promotions". In 2017, he managed for the first time in the third-tier Campeonato de Portugal, winning promotion as champions with a 2–1 final win over S.C. Farense on 10 June 2018.

Estoril
The day after getting Mafra into LigaPro, Freire left for G.D. Estoril Praia of that league, with the aim of reaching the top flight. On 29 July 2018, in his first match in professional football, his side beat Farense 2–0 away to reach the group stage of the Taça da Liga; on his league debut on 11 August the team won 4–0 at home to FC Porto B. He left on 21 January 2019 after a run of three losses and a draw.

Nacional
On 27 May 2019, Freire signed a one-year deal with C.D. Nacional, recently relegated to the second tier. The team were in first place when the season was abandoned prematurely due to the COVID-19 pandemic, meaning Freire had a record of 6 promotions in his first 8 seasons as a manager. In 2020–21, 34-year-old Freire was the youngest manager in that season of the Primeira Liga.

Freire made his top-flight debut on 20 September in a 3–3 home draw with Boavista FC. He left the club on 21 March 2021 after six consecutive defeats left them one point above the relegation zone.

Rio Ave
Freire returned to work on 29 June 2021, signing for newly relegated Rio Ave F.C. on a one-year deal. In his first season, he helped them bounce back as champions.

Managerial statistics

Honours
Mafra
Campeonato de Portugal: 2017–18

Rio Ave
Liga Portugal 2: 2021–22

References

External links
 
 ZeroZero Profile
 

1985 births
Living people
People from Mafra, Portugal
Portuguese football managers
Portuguese footballers
Primeira Liga managers
Liga Portugal 2 managers
G.D. Estoril Praia managers
C.D. Nacional managers
Rio Ave F.C. managers
Association football defenders
Sportspeople from Lisbon District